Thelma Wright (née Fynn; born 9 October 1951) is a Canadian middle-distance runner. She competed in the 1500 metres at the 1972 Summer Olympics and the 1976 Summer Olympics. In 1970, Wright won a bronze medal at the World Cross Country Championships in France, and a bronze at the Commonwealth Games in Edinburgh at 1500 metres.

In 1973, she won another bronze medal at the 1973 Pacific Conference Games in Toronto, in the 1500 metres, as well as at the Commonwealth Games in 1974, over the same distance. In 1975, she won a silver medal in the 3000 metres at the World Student Games in Rome, setting a Canadian Record of 8:54.94, which would ranked her 5th for the year. She would also win a silver medal in the 1500 metres at the Pan Am Games in Mexico City, 1975. She would also win seven Canadian Cross Country Championships during the 1970s. Wright also had two 4th-place finishes in the 1500 metres at the  World Students Games in Moscow in 1973, and Rome 1975.

References

External links
 

1951 births
Living people
Athletes (track and field) at the 1970 British Commonwealth Games
Athletes (track and field) at the 1972 Summer Olympics
Athletes (track and field) at the 1974 British Commonwealth Games
Athletes (track and field) at the 1975 Pan American Games
Athletes (track and field) at the 1976 Summer Olympics
Canadian female middle-distance runners
Olympic track and field athletes of Canada
Place of birth missing (living people)
Commonwealth Games medallists in athletics
Commonwealth Games bronze medallists for Canada
Universiade silver medalists for Canada
Universiade medalists in athletics (track and field)
Pan American Games medalists in athletics (track and field)
Pan American Games silver medalists for Canada
Medalists at the 1975 Summer Universiade
Medalists at the 1975 Pan American Games
Medallists at the 1970 British Commonwealth Games
Medallists at the 1974 British Commonwealth Games